These are the results of the women's singles competition, one of two events for female competitors in table tennis at the 1996 Summer Olympics in Atlanta.

Group stage

Group A

Group B

Group C

Group D

Group E

Group F

Group G

Group H

Group I

Group J

Group K

Group L

Group M

Group N

Group O

Group P

Knockout stage

References

External links
 Official Report of the Centennial Olympic Games, v.3. Digitally published by the LA84 Foundation.
 1996 Summer Olympics / Table Tennis / Singles, Women. Olympedia.

Table tennis at the 1996 Summer Olympics
Olym
Women's events at the 1996 Summer Olympics